Aghutman (also Romanized as Āghūtmān) is a village in Il Gavark Rural District, in the Central District of Bukan County, West Azerbaijan Province, Iran. At the 2006 census, its population was 432, in 63 families.

References 

Tageo

Populated places in Bukan County